Tom Giovatto is an American retired soccer player and the current head coach the St. Francis Brooklyn Terriers men's soccer team.

Early life
Giovatto attended Xavier High School where he played forward on the soccer team. He then got a scholarship to play at Iona College and graduated in 1997 receiving a Bachelor's Degree in Mass Communication.

Coaching
On August 22, 2007, Giovatto was appointed just the fourth head coach in the history of the St. Francis Brooklyn men’s soccer program. Since joining the program, he has led St. Francis Brooklyn to seven winning seasons, three NCAA Tournaments, and three NEC Tournament Championships. Giovatto's squads have been nationally ranked and he has helped coach two All-Americans, Kevin Correa and Vincent Bezecourt.

In 2013, Giovatto's team went 12–6–1 overall, won the 2013 Northeast Conference Tournament and participated in the 2013 NCAA Tournament, for the first time since 1982. Due to his impressive performance, Giovatto was named the BigAppleSoccer.com Coach of the Year and the NSCAA North Atlantic Region Coach of the Year.

In 2014, the Terriers went 11–6–4 overall and 4–1–2 in conference play. The team won their second consecutive Northeast Conference Tournament and participated in the 2014 NCAA Tournament. The 2015 Terriers started the season unbeaten in their first 9 games and as a result were ranked at 22nd Nationally by the NSCAA Top 25 Coaches Poll for the first time in the Tom Giovatto era. Yet the finished at 10–4–4 overall and 3–2–2 in conference play.

In 2016, Giovatto won NEC Coach of the Year, after leading his team to an NEC Regular Season Championship, he then proceeded to win the 2016 NEC Tournament and participate in the NCAA Division I Men's Soccer Championship. Giovatto was also named BigAppleSoccer.com men's college coach of the year and Northeast Region head coach of the year by the National Soccer Coaches Association of America.

In 2017, Giovatto won NEC Coach of the Year, after leading his team to an NEC Regular Season Championship, he then proceeded to win the 2017 NEC Tournament and participate in the NCAA Division I Men's Soccer Championship.

Head coaching record

References

External links
 St. Francis Brooklyn Terriers Bio

St. Francis Brooklyn Terriers men's soccer coaches
1975 births
Living people
Iona Gaels men's soccer players
Saint Peter's Peacocks men's soccer coaches
Stony Brook Seawolves men's soccer coaches
Association football forwards
American soccer coaches
Association football players not categorized by nationality